The Kyiv Academic Theatre of Ukrainian Folklore (Bereginya) is a theatre in Kyiv in Ukraine. It was founded in 1983.

External links
Official site

Theatres in Kyiv
1983 establishments in Ukraine
Folk arts